Jatropha bullockii is a species of plant in the family Euphorbiaceae. It is endemic to Mexico.

References

Endemic flora of Mexico
bullockii
Vulnerable plants
Taxonomy articles created by Polbot